Michael Finn is an Irish international amateur sportsperson who has represented Ireland in Australian rules football and basketball as well as Kerry GAA and Victoria in Gaelic football.

Sporting career

Gaelic football
He represented Kerry GAA at all levels winning a Munster Under-21 Football Championship Medal in 2002 and was also part of the senior team that lost the 2002 All-Ireland Final. He played with the famous Austin Stacks club in Tralee, winning a Kerry Under-21 Football Championship medal in 2002. In Australia, he represented Victoria in the Australasian GAA Championships.

Australian football
Finn played for Ireland national Australian rules football team in the 2005 Australian Football International Cup, in Melbourne and returned with the team for the 2008 Australian Football International Cup, reaching the semi finals on both occasions. He went on to help Ireland reclaim the 2011 Australian Football International Cup title. He was Ireland's leading goalkicker scoring 4 goals in the final. He was selected on the International Cup All Star Team on 4 occasions and won the 'best & fairest player award' in 2008. In his last international appearance in 2014 he was named captain of International Cup All Star Team.

He played suburban football for the Caulfield Bears (Southern Football League) and the Heidelberg Football Club (Northern Football League), winning league best and fairest awards in 2006 and 2011.

Basketball
He also represented the Ireland national basketball team 15 times.

Gallery

References

1981 births
Living people
Kerry inter-county Gaelic footballers
Austin Stacks Gaelic footballers
Irish men's basketball players
Irish players of Australian rules football
Gaelic footballers who switched code
Heidelberg Football Club players